Frank Gerald Cummins (26 September 1896 – 23 May 1971) was an Australian rules footballer who played with South Melbourne and Melbourne in the Victorian Football League (VFL).

Notes

External links 

 
Demonwiki profile

1896 births
1971 deaths
Australian rules footballers from Victoria (Australia)
Sydney Swans players
Melbourne Football Club players